The GNU Affero General Public License (GNU AGPL) is a free, copyleft license published by the Free Software Foundation in November 2007, and based on the GNU GPL version 3 and the Affero General Public License.

It is intended for software designed to be run over a network, adding a provision requiring that the corresponding source code of modified versions of the software be prominently offered to all users who interact with the software over a network.

The Open Source Initiative approved the GNU AGPLv3 as an open source license in March 2008 after the company Funambol submitted it for consideration through its CEO Fabrizio Capobianco.

Compatibility with the GPL 
GNU AGPLv3 and GPLv3 licenses each include clauses (in section 13 of each license) that together achieve a form of mutual compatibility for the two licenses. These clauses explicitly allow the "conveying" of a work formed by linking code licensed under the one license against code licensed under the other license, despite the licenses otherwise not allowing relicensing under the terms of each other. In this way, the copyleft of each license is relaxed to allow distributing such combinations.

Examples of applications under GNU AGPL 
Stet was the first software system known to be released under the GNU AGPL, on November 21, 2007, and is the only known program to be used mainly for the production of its own license.

Flask developer Armin Ronacher noted in 2013 that the GNU AGPL is a "terrible success, especially among the startup community" as a "vehicle for dual commercial licensing", and gave Humhub, MongoDB, Odoo, RethinkDB, Shinken, Slic3r, SugarCRM, and WURFL as examples.

MongoDB dropped the AGPL in late-2018 in favor of the "Server Side Public License" (SSPL), a modified version which requires those who offer the licensed software as a service accessible to third-parties, to make the entire source code of all software used to facilitate the service (including without limitation all "management software, user interfaces, application program interfaces, automation software, monitoring software, backup software, storage software and hosting software, all such that a user could run an instance of the service using the Service Source Code you make available") available under the same license. The SSPL has been rejected by the Open Source Initiative and banned by both Debian and the Fedora Project, who state that the license's intent is to discriminate against cloud computing providers offering services based on the software without purchasing its commercial license.

See also

References

External links 
  for GNU Affero General Public License (GNU AGPL).
 
  also includes info on version 2 of the Affero GPL.
 

Free Software Foundation
Free and open-source software licenses
Copyleft software licenses